Darrell Patton Evans (born October 6, 1968) is an American evangelical Christian musician and songwriter, known primarily for his contributions to contemporary Christian worship. He is known as the writer of songs like "Trading My Sorrows", "Let the River Flow", "Your Love Is Extravagant", "Redeemer, Savior Friend", "Freedom", and "Fields of Grace."

Influenced by the music of Bruce Springsteen and U2, his style of music is noted for its extensive use of free form composition, with several of his songs having been written spontaneously during concerts and worship times. Besides his music writing, he is an accomplished guitar player and singer.

Biography
He was born in San Francisco, California, into a military family, where they moved frequently around the western United States and Europe. Evans was the oldest child of a practicing Catholic couple. He became a born-again Christian at a Leon Patillo concert in 1980 at eleven years old. He began worship leading at fourteen years old.

He was a student of LIFE Bible College in San Dimas, California, before relocating to Tulsa, Oklahoma, where he was a worship leader at Vineyard Church, while he learned evangelism at Oral Roberts University. He went to Reno, Nevada, after leaving Oral Roberts, where he took a worship leader position with University Family Fellowship, before again going back to Tulsa, Oklahoma, to lead worship at Open Bible Fellowship Church.

Music and ministry 
Evans started honing his songwriting at fourteen years-old, eventually becoming known as the writer of songs like "Trading My Sorrows", "Let the River Flow", "Your Love Is Extravagant", "Redeemer, Savior Friend", "Freedom", and "Fields of Grace." He is considered by many to be a pioneer in the modern worship music movement.

Evans's ministry started as a teenager in Olympia, WA, playing spiritual music for classmates in his parents' home. He has served as a worship pastor for churches in Washington, California, Oklahoma and Texas.

For the past 17 years Darrell has traveled the world alone and with the band, combining music with worship, preaching, and prayer.

Darrell's projects "Let the River Flow" and "Freedom" both garnered Dove award nominations and influenced a new wave of congregational worship. A later project, "Nothing Less Than Everything", wraps his joy, passion and experience in a fresh and powerful sound. In Darrell's words, "It's my prayer that the Lord will use these songs to help people connect with Jesus in a life-changing way".

In 2013, Evans signed an exclusive publishing administration deal with Watershed Music Group, while continuing to release independent worship recording project.

Personal life 
Evans has five children: two daughters, Leah and Makenzie, and three sons, Connor, Zachary and Grayson. "They are my heart and world. My kids have changed my life for the better. I want to be the Godly father and leader that they need," Darrell said about his children.

Discography

Albums

Compilations

References

External links
Worshipmusic.com
Watershed Music Group

1968 births
Living people
American performers of Christian music